Absolute Radio 90s is a semi-national digital radio station owned and operated by Bauer as part of the Absolute Radio Network. Its output is non-stop 1990s hits.

The station launched on DAB in London in June 2010 and on the Digital One platform on 25 August 2010 and was initially available for one month as a "test". However, the availability of the station nationally continued beyond the end of September, and after a strong opening RAJAR figure, it was confirmed that the 90s service would continue to be available on Digital One. It remained on that multiplex until January 2015, when its slot was given over to Magic. Ahead of this change Absolute 90s began appearing on a number of local DAB ensembles from 12 December 2014, replacing Kerrang! Radio in many cases. Absolute 90s continues to broadcast nationally via satellite TV and online, and on 29 January 2018 the station went nationwide on DAB.

Background
The station was announced in May 2010 when Absolute Radio 80s launched on the Digital One national multiplex.

Launch
The service was launched on 21 June 2010 by Christian O'Connell at 10am with the Oasis song "Roll With It" the first song played on the station. It was then followed by a 90s mixtape.

Like its other digital spin-offs, Absolute Radio 90s also carries the Dave Berry breakfast show from Absolute Radio. During the 2013 season, Absolute Radio 90s was the UK's broadcaster of NFL (American football) games, taking over in that capacity from BBC Radio 5 Live Sports Extra. (Absolute Radio abandoned NFL broadcasts in 2014.)

Availability 
The service, which took over the slots previously used by Absolute Radio 80s, was available in London on the Switch Digital multiplex. The station replaced dabbl in Bristol, Essex, London, Newbury, Reading, Swindon and Cardiff.  The service is also available on Sky  (channel 0203).

Absolute Radio 90s launched on the Digital One platform in August 2010, initially as a test due to run until 30 September 2010. This used the broadcast capacity of Absolute Radio Extra during that station's downtime. The trial was subsequently extended, and in November 2010 it was confirmed that the station would remain on Digital One, sharing with Extra as before, on a permanent basis, and that a new station, Absolute Radio 00s ("Noughties") would launch on DAB in London in December (in the former 90s slot.) As a result of its national launch Absolute Radio 90s has now also been removed from the other local DAB multiplexes it broadcast on (Absolute Classic Rock took over the slot on the Cardiff local multiplex).

As a result of sharing its Digital One slot with Absolute Radio Extra, Absolute Radio 90s was off-air on DAB between 1:30pm and 6:30pm on Saturdays. However, the digital TV and internet broadcasts of the 90s station were uninterrupted and continuous throughout this period. Following the closure of Absolute Radio Extra, Absolute Radio 90s regained a full uninterrupted service on all platforms.

At the end of 2017, Absolute Radio 90s resumed transmitting nationally on Digital One, taking the place of temporary station Magic Christmas, and so during 2018 had dual illumination on local and national tier. In February 2019, as part of the reorganisation of DAB capacity required ahead of the launch of Scala Radio, Absolute Radio 90s began transmitting on SDL National (taking the place of Heat Radio) with its other slots vacated, the Digital One slot going to Kisstory and local-tier slots to Magic Chilled, both of which in turn gave up their SDL capacity to Scala.

References

External links

Absolute Radio
Radio stations established in 2010
2010 establishments in the United Kingdom
1990s-themed radio stations
Bauer Radio